Omair Yousuf (born 27 December 1998) is a Pakistani cricketer. He made his List A debut for Karachi Whites in the 2018–19 Quaid-e-Azam One Day Cup on 13 September 2018. He made his first-class debut for Karachi Whites in the 2018–19 Quaid-e-Azam Trophy on 16 September 2018.

In September 2019, he was named in Sindh's squad for the 2019–20 Quaid-e-Azam Trophy tournament. In November 2019, he was named in Pakistan's squad for the 2019 ACC Emerging Teams Asia Cup in Bangladesh. In October 2021, he was named in the Pakistan Shaheens squad for their tour of Sri Lanka.

References

External links
 

1998 births
Living people
Pakistani cricketers
Karachi Whites cricketers
Quetta Gladiators cricketers
Cricketers from Karachi